Knieküchle is a traditional Austrian/German fried dough pastry that is very popular in Old Bavaria, Franconia, Western Austria, South Tyrol and Thuringia. Depending on region it has several other names, including Auszogne, Krapfen, Küchl, Nudel or Rottnudel. In Austria its name is Bauernkrapfen or Kiachl.

Preparation
As a general rule they are made of yeast dough but some recipes vary slightly. Very common for example is the addition of raisins. The dough is then shaped in a way so it is very thin in the middle and thicker on the edges. They are then fried in boiling lard and dusted with confectioner's sugar. In Austria and in South Tyrol it is eaten with apricot marmalade, lingonberry
jam or sauerkraut.

In the past, the pastry was mostly eaten during the harvest and on holidays, especially for Kermesse or Dult.

In Franconia, people also differentiate between "catholic" and "protestant" Knieküchle depending whether it is dusted with confectioner's sugar or not.

Name etymology
According to legend, the name derives from the practice of baker women from Franconia that stretched the dough over their knees very thinly so they could read love letters through it.

References

External links 
Knieküchle (Krapfen, Kiechla) (frankentourismus.de)

Austrian pastries
Austrian cuisine
Bavarian cuisine
German pastries